The list of political families of Tamil Nadu state in India.

Families in  DMK

The Karunanidhi Family - DMK
Late M. Karunanidhi, Former Chief Minister of Tamil Nadu
 M. K. Stalin, current Chief Minister of Tamil Nadu  (Son of Karunanidhi) 
Udhayanidhi Stalin, son of M.K.Stalin. He is DMK 's youth wing secretary and Minister for Youth Welfare and Sports Development of Tamil Nadu
 M. K. Alagiri, former Union Minister in Government of India (Eldest son of Karunanidhi)
 Kanimozhi, Member of Parliament from Lok Sabha (Daughter of Karunanidhi)
 Late Murasoli Maran, Former Union Minister in Government of India (nephew of Karunanidhi)
Dayanidhi Maran, Member of Parliament from Lok Sabha and Former Union Minister in Government of India (son of Murasoli).

The Durai Murugan Family - DMK 
Durai Murugan (Current Minister for Water Resources of Tamil Nadu)
Kathir Anand Member of Parliament from Vellore (Lok Sabha constituency) (Only Son of Durai Murugan)

The P.T.R Family - DMK 
 P. T. Rajan, Chief Minister of Madras Presidency in 1936.
 P. T. R. Palanivel Rajan, former Speaker of the Tamil Nadu Legislative Assembly and Minister in the State Cabinet.
P.T.R.Palanivel Thiyagarajan , finance minister of Tamil Nadu.

The T R Baalu Family - DMK 
T R Baalu, MP from Sriperumbudur and Treasurer of DMK
T R B Rajaa, MLA from Mannargudi , Member of TN State Planning Commission and Secretary of DMK IT Wing

The V. Thangapandian Family - DMK 
  V. ThangapandianFormer MLA Aruppukottai (state assembly constituency) 
Thangam Thennarasu, Son of [V. Thangapandian]. Minister for Department of Industries, Tamil Official Language, Tamil Culture and Archeology Minister of Tamil Nadu]] 
Thamizhachi Thangapandian, Daughter  of [V. Thangapandian]. She is member of Parliament Chennai South (Lok Sabha constituency)

The I. Periyasamy Family - DMK 
I. Periyasamy,  2021 Minister of Co-operation, Government of Tamil Nadu.
I P Senthil Kumar, Son of I.Periyasamy, an MLA from Attur (state assembly constituency)

The Anbil P. Dharmalingam Family - DMK 
Anbil P. Dharmalingam, was one of the founder-members of the  Dravida Munnetra Kazhagam (DMK)
Anbil Poyyamozhi, son of Anbil P. Dharmalingam, Former minister of School Education of Tamil Nadu,
Anbil Mahesh Poyyamozhi, son of  Anbil  Poyyamozhi  a member of Dravida Munnetra Kazhagam, Minister for School Education in Tamil Nadu
Anbil Periyasamy, son of Anbil P. Dharmalingam, Former Member of the Legislative Assembly of Tamil Nadu, Tiruchirappalli – II

The K. Anbazhagan Family - DMK 
K. Anbazhagan, Former minister of Finance.
A.Vetriazhagan, Grandson of K. Anbazhagan, an MLA from Villivakkam (state assembly constituency)

The K. Ponmudy  Family - DMK
K. Ponmudy, Minister of Higher Education of Tamil Nadu
Gautham Sigamani, Son of K.Ponmudy, an MP from Kallakurichi (Lok Sabha constituency)

The Aladi Aruna (alias) V Arunachalam Family - DMK 
Aladi Aruna, Former Minister of Law  
Poongothai Aladi Aruna, Daughter of Aladi Aruna, Former minister of Tamil Nadu for Information Technology

The N. V. Natarajan Family -  DMK 
N. V. Natarajan Founding member of DMK. He was former minister for Labour  and Backward classes in Tamil Nadu Government during 1969 - 1975
N. V. N. Somu Son of N. V. Natarajan. He was former Lok Shaba member. 
Kanimozhi NVN Somu Daughter of N. V. N. Somu Member of Rajya Shaba from DMK.

The Arcot N. Veeraswami Family - DMK 
Arcot N. Veeraswami Former treasurer of DMK, Former Minister of DMK
Kalanidhi Veeraswamy  Member of Lok Shaba from North Chennai constituency

The N. Periasamy Family - DMK 
N. Periasamy,former Member of the Legislative Assembly (MLA) from Tuticorin constituency in the 1989[1] and 1996 elections.
Geetha Jeevan  is the daughter of N. Periasamy,Minister for Social Welfare and Women Empowerment

The K. P. P. Samy Family - DMK 
K. P. P. Samy,former Minister for Fisheries in Tamil Nadu state of India
K P Shankar, brother of K. P. P. Samy,member Legislative Assembly from the Tiruvottiyur constituency in 2021

The S. Sivasubramanian Family - DMK
S. Sivasubramanian, Member of the Legislative Assembly of Tamil Nadu from Andimadam constituency in 1989 election
S. S. Sivasankar,Minister for Transport

The Families in Congress

The Rajagopalachari Family - Congress 
Late C. Rajagopalachari, Chief Minister of Madras Presidency (1937–40), Madras State (1952–54), Governor of West Bengal (1946–48), Governor-General of India (1948–50). Union Minister in Government of India (1950–52).
 Gopalkrishna Gandhi, Governor of West Bengal.
 C. R. Narasimhan, Former Member of Lok Sabha from Krishnagiri.

The C.P.Ramaswami Iyer family - Congress
 C. P. Ramaswami Iyer, Member of Madras Legislative Council and Diwan of Travancore.
 C. R. Pattabhi Raman, Former Member of Lok Sabha from Kumbakonam.

The Bhaktavatsalam Family - Congress 
 M. Bhaktavatsalam, Chief Minister of Madras state (1962–1967).
Jayanthi Natarajan, Former Member of Indian Parliament.

The Families in AIADMK

The Ramachandran Family - AIADMK
Late M. G. Ramachandran (former Chief Minister of Tamil Nadu)
Late V. N. Janaki Ramachandran, wife of MGR, (former Chief Minister of Tamil Nadu)

The O. Paneerselvam Family - AIADMK 
O. Paneerselvam (Former Deputy Chief Minister of Tamil Nadu)
O. P. Raveendranath Kumar Member of Parliament (Eldest son of O.P.S)

Families in multiparties

The Kumaramangalam Family - Multiparty
Late P. Subbarayan,  former Chief Minister of Madras Presidency (1926–1930), Member of Lok Sabha from Tiruchengode
 Radhabai Subbarayan, Famous human rights activist
 Mohan Kumaramangalam, politician and trade union leader from the Communist Party of India.
 Rangarajan Kumaramangalam, Indian politician. Member of Lok Sabha from Salem and later, Tiruchirapalli and Union Minister in Government of India
 Lalitha Kumaramangalam, politician and member of the BJP's national executive.
 Parvathi Krishnan , Former Member of Lok Sabha from Coimbatore.

The V. K. Sasikala Family - Multi Parties
VK Sasikala, Indian Businesswoman turned Politician 
 M. Natarajan, Sasikala's husband                              
 V. K. Dhivakaran, Founding General Secretary Of Anna Dravidar Kazhagam and brother of VK Sasikala               
 T. T. V. Dhinakaran,  General Secretary Of Ammk and Sasikala's elder Sister Vanimani's Son                   
 Anuradha Dhinakaran , Dhinakaran's wife.                   
 V. N. Sudhakaran, Jayalalithaa's foster son and brother of TTV Dhinakaran                          
 T. T. V. Bhaskaran, Founding General Secretary Of Anna Mgr Makkal Munnetra Kazhagam and brother of TTV Dhinakaran                           
 J. Illavarsi, Sasikala's brother Jayaraman's widow                        
 Vivek Jayaraman, Sasikala's brother Jayaraman's son

Family in MDMK

The Vaiko Family - MDMK
 Vaiko, founder of the Marumalarchi Dravida Munnetra Kazhagam.
 Durai Vaiyapuri, Internet wing MDMK.

Family in PMK

The Ramadoss Family - PMK
S. Ramadoss PMK founder
Anbumani Ramadoss Member of Parliament from Rajya Sabha and former Cabinet Minister (Ministry of Health) during 2004-09

Family in TMC

The G. K. Moopanar Family - TMC 
Late G. K. Moopanar, Indian politician and founder of the Tamil Maanila Congress.
 G. K. Vasan, Former Union Minister in Government of India.

 
Political families of India by state or union territory
Tamil Nadu politics-related lists